The Lambeth Bible is a 12th-century illuminated manuscript (perhaps produced circa 1150–1170), among the finest surviving giant Bibles from Romanesque England.  It exists in two volumes; the first is in Lambeth Palace Library (MS 3) and covers Genesis to Job on 328 leaves of vellum measuring circa 520 x 355 mm; the second incomplete volume (covering Psalms to Revelation) is in the Maidstone Museum & Art Gallery (MS P.5).

The style of the illumination is clearly influenced by the work of Master Hugo, the illuminator of the Bury Bible. The Lambeth Bible bears close stylistic resemblance to the Gospel Book made for Abbot Wedric of Liessies Abbey (Hainault) in 1146, of which only two leaves survive (the rest having been destroyed at Metz in World War II), now in Avesnes-sur-Helpe. Eric Millar proposed a Canterbury provenance, which C. R. Dodwell supported in his study of the Canterbury scriptorium of 1954. More recently, Josef Reidmaier argued that the manuscript was produced in the Christ Church scriptorium around 1150. Dorothy Shepard argues that the book was produced in the scriptorium of St Augustine's Abbey between 1150-70. However, none of the divisions of the two-volume Bibles included in the inventory of the St Augustine’s library correspond to that of the Lambeth Bible. Christopher de Hamel instead links the Bible to Faversham Abbey, and claims that it was being produced for King Stephen. He supports his claim by drawing attention to the frequent royal imagery in the Bible, and the short period between 1146 (when the illuminator was in France) and 1154 (King Stephen's death) as an explanation for the Bible's incomplete state.

For many years the first volume in the Lambeth Palace Library was paired with another volume (MS. 4) in the library, but in 1924 it was realised that the correct pairing was with the Maidstone volume.

See also
 Winchester Bible
 Bury Bible

References 

Dorothy Shepard: Introducing the Lambeth Bible: a Study of Text and Imagery. 2007 
Richard Palmer, Michelle P. Brown (eds): Lambeth Palace Library: Treasures from the Collections of the Archbishops of Canterbury. 2010. 
Christopher de Hamel: Lecture at Lambeth Palace, 19 June 2010.

Illuminated biblical manuscripts
12th-century biblical manuscripts
12th-century illuminated manuscripts